Tahoe Keys is a private waterfront community within the city of South Lake Tahoe in El Dorado County, California. The Tahoe Keys is a  marina community laced with eleven miles of inland waterways located at the southern tip of Lake Tahoe in South Lake Tahoe, California. Most of the 1500+ members who own homes, townhouses or vacant lots have a private boat dock and are located on numerous lagoons, canals or the Tahoe Keys Marina with its boat launching ramps.

Environmental impacts
Constructed in the 1960s, the community consists of over 1,500 homes adjacent to a series of canals. Its construction destroyed half of the Upper Truckee Marsh, the primary filter for river water entering the lake, and has since been called the most environmentally damaging intrusion on the lakeshore in Lake Tahoe's human history.

The Tahoe Keysdue to lack of maintenance and poor planninghave the largest population of non-native plants and fish in Lake Tahoe. The problem is severe enough that the most common control methods have failed. As a result there has been some controversy about whether to make special allowances for otherwise banned herbicides in Lake Tahoe.

External links
TKPOA Official Website

References

Neighborhoods in South Lake Tahoe, California
Lake Tahoe
History of the Sierra Nevada (United States)
Populated places in the Sierra Nevada (United States)